The Ninth Avenue derailment, on the Ninth Avenue Elevated in Manhattan on September 11, 1905, was the worst accident on the New York City elevated railways, resulting in 13 deaths and 48 serious injuries.

Context
Trains of the Ninth Avenue and Sixth Avenue elevated lines shared the same track above West 53rd Street, where the Sixth Avenue line branched off. Downtown-bound trains displayed disks indicating to the towerman at the junction whether he should set the switch for the train to enter the curve or proceed straight on to the 50th Street station.

Accident
During the morning rush hour on September 11, 1905, a Ninth Avenue train following a Sixth Avenue train was mistakenly switched onto the curve. The motorman, Paul Kelly, realizing the error, braked quickly. The lead car remained on the tracks but the second was thrown right off the trestle and down to the street, coming to rest with one end on the ground and the other across the third rail on the trestle, which sparked an electrical fire. 

The roof was torn off and some passengers were crushed under the car by a falling truck and motor equipment from the third car, which came to rest hanging off the edge of the trestle against the front of an apartment building, into which some passengers were able to escape through a window. The rest of the train also derailed but continued down the trestle along Ninth Avenue. The death toll was 13, and 48 serious injuries in the second car. A police officer who had been standing in the street was also injured.

Aftermath
On September 23, the report of the Board of Rapid Transit Railroad Commissioners laid most of the blame for the accident on motorman Kelly, but some on the towerman, Cornelius Jackson, who was said to have been away from his post at the time of the accident. On October 2, the coroner's jury held both responsible.

Kelly claimed the train had been displaying the correct disks for Ninth Avenue; Jackson claimed it had not. The train's conductor, J.W. Johnson, who had the job of setting the disks on the train, backed Kelly, and so did the company, since station guards had identified the train as Ninth Avenue at every stop it had made before the accident. 

However, the coroner's jury found that Kelly should have seen that the signal indicated the switch was set for Sixth Avenue, and that he was driving recklessly fast. Nevertheless, Kelly, who went missing after the accident, told a fellow motorman immediately afterwards that Jackson had been "trying to do him," accusing Jackson of having previously changed disks on the signal tower at the last second, forcing Kelly to back onto the other tracks, thus losing time and getting in trouble with the railway company. 

Kelly could not back onto the other tracks this time because of his speed, which he explained had been due to the guards at 59th Street having called out 42nd Street as the next stop. Kelly was making up lost time on what he thought would be a straightaway to 42nd Street, not realizing until it was too late that the switch had actually been set for the curve to Sixth Avenue.

Jackson was convicted of second degree manslaughter but his conviction was later overturned. Kelly was arrested in San Francisco in June 1907, almost two years after the accident. He was convicted of manslaughter in the second degree and was sentenced to 1 1/2-2 1/2 years in prison. In February 1909, Kelly escaped from Sing Sing prison with another inmate he met while building a new prison at Bear Mountain, due to the bad food and brutal treatment. At the time Kelly had only six months left of his sentence as he was a model inmate. When the other inmate became ill, Kelly refused to continue on alone, and the two were subsequently captured.

Notes

References

Sources
 
 

1905 in New York City
New York City Subway accidents
Accidents and incidents involving Interborough Rapid Transit Company
Railway accidents in 1905